The 2022–23 season is the 77th in the history of TSV Hartberg and their fifth consecutive season in the top flight. The club are participating in the Austrian Football Bundesliga and the Austrian Cup.

Players

First team squad

Out on loan

Pre-season and friendlies

Competitions

Overall record

Austrian Football Bundesliga

League table

Results summary

Results by round

Matches 
The league fixtures were announced on 22 June 2022.

Austrian Cup

References

TSV Hartberg
Hartberg